"Gugur Bunga di Taman Bakti" (The Fallen Flower in the Garden of Devotion), better known as "Gugur Bunga", is an Indonesian patriotic song written by Ismail Marzuki in 1945. Written to honor the Indonesian soldiers killed during the Indonesian National Revolution, it tells of the death of a soldier, and the singer's feelings. It has since become a common song for protests and funerals. The song's line gugur satu, tumbuh seribu (one falls, a thousand arise) has entered common Indonesian vernacular.

Writing
"Gugur Bunga" was written by Ismail Marzuki in 1945 at the beginning of the Indonesian National Revolution. It was written in honour of the Indonesian soldiers who died fighting the Dutch colonial army. During the war, an estimated 45,000 to 100,000 Indonesians died in combat, with civilian casualties exceeding 25,000, possibly as many as 100,000.

Lyrics and structure

"Gugur Bunga" is performed andante moderato in  time.

Reception
"Gugur Bunga" is seen as a mournful, patriotic song about the death of a soldier fighting his enemy. As such, it has become a well-known nationalistic song in Indonesia, being covered by numerous artists. It is also considered a compulsory song for students to learn, along with "Indonesia Raya, "Satu Nusa Satu Bangsa", and "Bagimu Negeri".

"Gugur Bunga" is usually used at funerals and memorial services which involves military ceremonies, such as at the memorial service of former Indonesian president Abdurrahman Wahid, former President Suharto, former President B. J. Habibie, former First Lady Ainun Habibie, former First Lady Ani Yudhoyono, and veteran reporter Rosihan Anwar.

After the death of four students in the 1998 Trisakti shootings, the media used the lyrics gugur satu, tumbuh seribu as a slogan for the reformation movement and to indicate that the students had not died in vain. Today the line gugur satu, tumbuh seribu has entered common usage, with the meaning of "One falls, a thousand arise".

References

Bibliography
 
 
 
 
 

1945 songs
Indonesian patriotic songs
Funerary and memorial compositions